My Documents is a DVD by Bosnian alternative rock band Sikter that was released on June 19, 2007. It was released by record label Gramfon in co-production with Pro.ba, modern art center from Sarajevo.

The main part of DVD occupies a documentary film "I Was Dreaming of a Smirnoff Buffalo". It's biographical film which follows band from formation in 1990 until 2007 and releasing their third album My Music. Film including subtitles on Bosnian and English language.

Contents

My Film
This part consists from documentary film "I Was Dreaming of a Smirnoff Buffalo". Film was directed by Timur Makarević and premiere was on 24 August, 2007. It follows band from formation in 1990 until 2007. Also many interviewees participated in film, mostly current and former members of band and some Bosnian artists.

My Audio
Some unreleased audio recordings from the early and war periods of the band, including many live recordings.

My Video
All music videos from 1995 to 2007 and some unreleased live videos. It also contains a music video of song "Shake 'em" with the forbidden subliminal message.

My Photos
Sentimental photo album of the current and former members of the band. Most photographs were never published.

My Recycle Bin
Uncensored shoots from recording of the film "I Was Dreaming of a Smirnoff Buffalo".

Personnel
Sikter
Enes Zlatan - vocals, keyboards
Esad Bratović - guitar
Dragan Rokvić - bass guitar, vocals
Igor Čamo - keyboards
Nedim Zlatar - drums
Dejan Kajević - backing vocals
Leonardo Šarić - backing vocals
Production
Timur Makarević - director
Redžimald Šimek - mastering

External links
Gramofon: Sikter - My Documents

Sikter albums
2007 video albums